Kari Mäkinen (born 30 August 1945 in Tampere) is a Finnish sprint canoeist who competed in the mid-1960s. He finished ninth in the C-2 1000 m event at the 1964 Summer Olympics in Tokyo.

References
Sports-reference.com profile

External links

1945 births
Living people
Canoeists from Tampere
Canoeists at the 1964 Summer Olympics
Finnish male canoeists
Olympic canoeists of Finland